Hayder Shkara (born 21 May 1990) is a former professional Taekwondo athlete.

Early life 
Shkara was introduced to martial arts at the age of 8, whilst living in Sydney. He entered the Australian national team in 2006.

He attempted to gain selection to the London 2012 Olympic Games but failed to qualify, after a loss to Vaughn Scott.

At a rematch with Vaughn at an Oceania 2016 qualifying tournament, Shkara was victorious and secured entry to the 2016 Summer Olympics.

2016 Summer Olympics 
Shkara's first match was against Lutalo Muhammad of Great Britain (the eventual silver medalist). He was defeated 14-0, and suffered a broken rib.

Due to Lutalo Muhammad making the finals, Shkara was given entry to a bronze medal match against the Steven Lopez (USA).

After a sudden death round, Shkara was defeated on a count back of touches.

Career post-retirement 
After retiring from professional Taekwondo, Shkara began work as a lawyer practicing in Australian family law. In 2017, he started his own law firm, Justice Family Lawyers in Sydney.

He has appeared on the Australian TV program Insight.

References

Living people
Australian male taekwondo practitioners
Taekwondo practitioners at the 2016 Summer Olympics
Olympic taekwondo practitioners of Australia
1990 births
21st-century Australian people